This is a list of fellows of the Royal Society elected in 1694.

Fellows 
Patrick Gordon  (d. 1702)
John Jackson  (1672–1724)
James Brydges 1st Duke of Chandos (1674–1744)

References

1694
1694 in science
1694 in England